The 1994 Texas A&M Aggies football team represented Texas A&M University in the 1994 NCAA Division I-A football season.   The Aggies completed the season with a 10–0–1 record overall and a Southwest Conference mark of 6–0–1.  They were ineligible to win the Southwest Conference title or the postseason due to probation.

Due to NCAA sanctions, Texas A&M was also banned from television for the 1994 season. Only one other team has been banned from television since, the 1995 Ole Miss Rebels. Coincidentally, Aggie defensive coordinator Tommy Tuberville left after this season to become Ole Miss' head coach.

The television ban caused the traditional rivalry game vs. Texas to be moved from Thanksgiving night to the first Saturday of November. Texas instead played Baylor on Thanksgiving in a nationally-televised game.

Schedule

Roster

80 Kevin Beirne Wide Receiver 6'4" 210 lbs The Woodlands, TX The Woodlands High School

47 James Bennett Punter 6'0" 200 lbs Austin, TX Westlake High School

21 Wilbert Lee Biggens Cornerback, Kick Returner 5'8" 184 lbs Aldine, TX Macarthur High School

87 Jim Brady Tight End 6'5" 208 lbs Arlington, TX Lamar High School

68 Daniel Horn Linebacker 5'11" 252 lbs Pasadena, TX  Sam Rayburn High School

RS Darren Brinkley Wide Receiver 6'1" 170 lbs Belton, TX Belton High School

78 James Brooks Offensive Line 6'4" 265 lbs Fort Worth, TX Trimble Technical High School

RS Don Brown Offensive Line 6'5" 296 lbs Houston, TX Mayde Creek High School

41 Kyle Bryant Kicker 5'7" 172 lbs College Station, TX A & M Cons High School

12 Kevin Caffey Defensive Back 6'-1" 190 lbs Rockdale, TX High School

RS Dan Campbell Tight End 6'5" 262 lbs Glen Rose, TX Glen Rose High School

10 Stormy Case Quarterback 6'0" 188 lbs Odessa, TX Permian High School

85 Hayward Clay Tight End 6'3" 260 lbs Snyder, TX Snyder High School

66 Michael Cody Offensive Line 6'5" 275 lbs San Antonio, TX Jay High School

54 Calvin Collins Offensive Guard 6'2" 307 lbs Beaumont, TX West Brook Sr High School

70 Robert Danklefs Offensive Tackle 6'4"286 lbs San Antonio, TX Clark High School

16 Steve Emerson Quarterback 6'2" 198 lbs Aldine, TX Macarthur High School

67 Hunter Goodwin Offensive Tackle 6'5" 268 lbs Bellville, TX Bellville High School

27 Donovan Greer Cornerback 5'9"178 lbs Alief, TX Elsik High School

33 Clif Groce Fullback 5'11" 245 lbs College Station, TX A & M Cons High School

57 Marcus Heard Defensive Line 6'3" 275 lbs San Antonio, TX Clark High School

40 Mike Hendricks Strong Safety 6'0" 180 lbs Converse, TX Judson High School

89 Ed Jasper Defensive Line 6'2" 293 lbs Troup, TX Troup High School

72 Jeff Jones Offensive Line 6'6" 310 lbs Killeen, TX Killeen High School

36 Steve Kenney Safety 6'0" 190 lbs Kilgore, TX Kilgore High School

17 Gene Lowery Wide Receiver 6'0" 180 lbs Kilgore, TX Kilgore High School

RS Justin Lucas Defensive Back 5'10" 211 lbs Victoria, TX-

84 Matt Mahone Tight End 6'4" 249 lbs Longview, TX Pine Tree High School

81 Ryan Mathews Wide Receiver 5'11" 188 lbs Houston, TX Lamar High School

73 Todd Mathison Offensive Line 6'4" 283 lbs Weatherford, TX Weatherford High School

49 Kyle Maxfield Free Safety 6'2" 182 lbs Sudan, TX Sudan High School

98 David Maxwell Defensive End, Linebacker 6'3" 250 lbs Waco, TX Midway High School

34 Leeland McElroy Halfback, Kick Returner 5'9" 212 lbs Beaumont, TX Central Senior High School

88 James McKeehan Tight End 6'3" 251 lbs Willis, TX Willis High School

6 Typail McMullen Safety 6'2" 185 lbs Lubbock, TX Dunbar High School

24 Ray Mickens Cornerback 5'8" 180 lbs El Paso, TX Andress High School

22 Billy Mitchell Cornerback 5'11" 186 lbs DeSoto, TX Desoto School

96 Brandon Mitchell Defensive Line 6'3" 290 lbs Abbeville, LA Abbeville High School

18 Brian Mitchell Flanker 6'0" 192 lbs Dallas, TX David W Carter High School

RS Dat Nguyen Linebacker 5'11" 238 lbs Rockport, TX Rockport-Fulton High School

RS Aaron Oliver Wide Receiver 6'2" 180 lbs Arlington, TX Lamar High School

19 Alcie Peterson Halfback 6'0" 194 lbs Bastrop, TX Bastrop High School

RS Ryan Pillans Kicker 6'0" 185 lbs Bryan, TX Bryan High School

4 Corey Pullig Quarterback 6'3" 199 lbs Deer Park, TX Deer Park High School

79 John Richard Offensive Guard 6'5" 275 lbs Houston, TX Lamar High School

76 Chris Ruhman Offensive Line 6'5"321 lbs Irving, TX Nimitz High School

7 Chris Sanders Wide Receiver 6'2" 217 lbs Austin, TX Lyndon B Johnson High School

44 Detron Smith Fullback 5'10"229 lbs Dallas, TX Lake Highlands High School

42 Sean Terry Punter 6'2"212 lbs Gunter, TX Gunter High School

20 Rodney Thomas Halfback 5'10" 210 lbs Groveton, TX Groveton J H-High School

52 David Vazquez Offensive Line 6'3" 277 lbs Alief, TX Elsik High School

49 Manoli Venetoulias Kicker 5'8"178 lbs Deer Park, TX Deer Park High School

71 Tim Vordenbaumen Offensive Line 6'5"262 lbs San Antonio, TX Clark High School

84 Keith Waguespack Kicker 6'3" 188 lbs Port Neches, TX Port Neches-Groves High School

29 Eddie Wallace Halfback 5'9" 184 lbsSpring, TX Spring High School

50 Brandon Ward Center 6'1" 245 lbs Dallas, TX Pearce High School

5 Junior White Free Safety 6'1" 169 lbs College Station, TX A & M Cons High School

26 Andre Williams Cornerback 5'9" 171 lbs Sherman, TX Sherman High School

13 Michael Williams Running Back 5'10" 211 lbs Lewisville, TX Roosevelt High School

11 Sherrod Wyatt Safety 6'2" 184 lbs Dallas, TX David W Carter High School

Game summaries

LSU

Oklahoma

Southern Miss

Texas Tech

Houston

Baylor

Rice

SMU
The deadlock ruined the Aggies' unblemished season and removed any minuscule hope A&M could finish win the Associated Press national championship (probation rendered the Aggies ineligible to be ranked at all in the Coaches' Poll). It is the last tie for the Aggies and Mustangs, since the NCAA adopted overtime for regular season games starting in 1996.

Texas

Louisville

TCU

References

Texas AandM
Texas A&M Aggies football seasons
College football undefeated seasons
Texas AandM Aggies football